Tai Choo Yee (as known as TCY) is a Malaysian YouTuber and journalist from Gutian County, Fuzhou, Fujian, China, uploading since 10 July 2019, most of his videos are test drives and car reviews. He is the creator of CarPlus and a former editor and news reporter for TopGear's Malaysian department.

Family 

 Hero Tai: Brother, Malaysian artist in Taiwan

References

External links  
 
 Tai Choo Yee at The Malaysian Insight

Malaysian journalists
Malaysian YouTubers
YouTube channels launched in 2019
Living people
1990 births